The First Gentleman is a 1948 British historical drama film directed by Alberto Cavalcanti, and starring Jean-Pierre Aumont, Joan Hopkins, and Cecil Parker. It portrays the relationships and marriage of George, Prince Regent and his tense dealings with other members of his family such as his only child Princess Charlotte and his younger brother Frederick, Duke of York. It was also released as Affairs of a Rogue.The film is based on a play, The First Gentleman by Norman Ginsbury, which was staged in London in 1945, starring Robert Morley as the Prince Regent and Wendy Hiller as Princess Charlotte.

The film title is taken from the Prince Regent's nickname, the First Gentleman of Europe.

Plot
The film traces the reign of the Prince Regent and his initial attempts to marry off his unruly daughter Charlotte to a number of acceptable nobles, attempts that fail because she falls for Leopold, a poverty-stricken German prince living in England. Charlotte's eventual marriage to Leopold is a happy one until their child is stillborn and she then dies, but at the film's conclusion his niece Victoria is born, stabilising the royal line of succession.

The film begins in Windsor Castle in 1810, with physicians telling the Queen that King George III will not recover his sanity. They inform Prince George that he is to become Regent.

The Prince Regent plans to marry his only daughter Princess Charlotte to Prince William of Orange and their engagement is announced. However, Charlotte shows more interest in Prince Leopold. The Prince Regent tries to force his opinion upon her. He himself is estranged from his wife Caroline and in a relationship with Isabella, his longstanding mistress.

Charlotte leaves to visit her mother Caroline at Connaught House without permission. John Fisher, Bishop of Salisbury is sent to retrieve her. Henry Brougham, a government advisor, is also sent to assist. They all persuade her to go back to Windsor Castle and stay with her grandmother, Queen Charlotte, for at least 18 months.

Meanwhile travelling on the continent, Prince Leopold meets Prince William of Orange, who informs him that the engagement to Charlotte was broken off a long time before. Prince Leopold therefore returns to England.

The Prince Regent is hosting a dinner at the newly completed Brighton Pavilion when a crowd begins to gather. They cheer Charlotte when she goes to the window to look at the fireworks but boo the Regent when he appears. His advisors tell him that if he were to let Charlotte marry Leopold he would be cheered. The Prince Regent is then persuaded by Charlotte to allow the marriage, but says that as the state would have to support Prince Leopold he would be better placed as ruler of Hanover: but Charlotte insists that she and Leopold will live in England. The Prince Regent decides to send abroad for Leopold's return, and it is then revealed that Leopold is already waiting in the wings.

Leopold and Charlotte marry and the Prince Regent buys them Claremont House as a wedding present. Charlotte soon becomes pregnant but their son is stillborn and Charlotte becomes immediately ill, dying shortly before her father arrives. He is devastated, saying "Two generations gone in a moment". Grieving, he organises a funeral fit for a queen.

18 months later he is at the christening of his brother Prince Edward's daughter. They debate calling her either Alexandrina or Charlotte, but fix upon Victoria as a suitable royal name.

Cast

Critical reception
TV Guide called it "a poorly mounted costume drama with a complicated script that moves at a snail's pace"
Allmovie wrote, "Swamped in period costumes and decor, Affairs of a Rogue is consistently good to look at, even when the plotline begins to drag."

References

External links
 

1948 films
1940s biographical drama films
British biographical drama films
Films directed by Alberto Cavalcanti
Cultural depictions of George IV
Films set in 1810
Columbia Pictures films
Films set in London
1940s historical drama films
British historical drama films
British films based on plays
British black-and-white films
1948 drama films
1940s English-language films
1940s British films